Sunil Lal Joshi (30 May 1964 – 25 June 2017) was a Nepalese weightlifter from Kathmandu. Joshi represented Nepal at the 1996 Summer Olympics in Atlanta, where he competed in the men's super-heavyweight category.

Athletic career
At the 1996 Olympics, Joshi placed seventeenth in this event, as he successfully lifted 120 kg in the snatch, and hoisted 162.5 kg from his third and final attempt in the clean and jerk, for a total of 282.5 kg.

Joshi also won a record 17 medals in the South Asian Games, claiming a total of six silver and eleven bronze medals in the span of eleven years.

Coach and executive
Joshi went on to become the chief coach of weightlifting at the National Sports Council. He joined as a coach on 17 September 1995 and was promoted to senior coach on 5 January 2006. He was also vice-president of the Nepal Weightlifting Association and chairman of the Olympic Association.

Death
After complaining of respiratory problems on 22 June 2017, he was taken to the Shahid Gangalal National Heart Centre in Kathmandu. Joshi died three days later of a heart attack. He was 53. He is survived by his wife and son.

References 

1966 births
2017 deaths
Nepalese male weightlifters
Olympic weightlifters of Nepal
Sportspeople from Kathmandu
Weightlifters at the 1996 Summer Olympics
South Asian Games silver medalists for Nepal
South Asian Games bronze medalists for Nepal
South Asian Games medalists in weightlifting